Harry Nelson Jonah (March 19, 1896 – October 31, 1985) was a Canadian politician. He served in the Legislative Assembly of New Brunswick as member of the Progressive Conservative party from 1952 to 1962.

References

1896 births
1985 deaths
20th-century Canadian politicians
20th-century Canadian lawyers
Progressive Conservative Party of New Brunswick MLAs
People from Albert County, New Brunswick